The Fixer is a Canadian four-part-miniseries.

Plot 
The Fixer is about a conspiracy of global proportions. Ellie Molara (Kathleen Robertson) of the US Department of Transportation is working as an investigator on a case that arouses her suspicions. A freighter collided with a rig, followed by a huge oil spill. What initially looks like an accident could have been a deliberate maneuver of a secret organization. At least this is stated by Carter (Eric Dane), who tells of a group of "fixers" who repeatedly initiate disasters and make them look like accidents to influence stock prices. Carter himself was part of this group, but has dropped out and now warns of a possible attack on Washington, D.C., which should be prevented.

Cast and characters 
 Eric Dane as Carter
 Kathleen Robertson as Ellie Molara
 Andrew Airlie as Grant
 Kaniehtiio Horn as Chloe
 Kyle Switzer as Tyler
 Yanic Truesdale as Kincaid

References

External links

2015 Canadian television series debuts
2015 Canadian television series endings
2010s Canadian crime drama television series